Aniwan language may refer to:

Nganyaywana language (Australia)
Futuna-Aniwan language (Vanuatu)